is a Japanese transportation company. It owns a fleet that includes dry cargo ships (bulk carriers), container ships, liquefied natural gas carriers, Ro-Ro ships, tankers, and container terminals. It used to be the fourteenth largest container transportation and shipping company in the world, before becoming part of Ocean Network Express.

History

1919-1944
"K" Line traces its origin to Kawasaki Heavy Industries, Ltd, which itself was born in 1878, when founder and entrepreneur Kawasaki Shōzō (川崎 正蔵) established Kawasaki Tsukiji Shipyard in Tokyo, Japan, which, eighteen years later, in 1896, was incorporated as Kawasaki Dockyard Co., Ltd.

The shipping activities were developed when Kawasaki Dockyard Co., Ltd. (predecessor of Kawasaki Heavy Industries)'s President Kojiro Matsukata, decided to develop shipping services so as to provide business to Kawasaki Dockyard and to serve Japan's national industrial and trade interests.

To do so, he placed Kawasaki Kisen, Kawasaki Zosen and Kokusai Kisen under joint management to build a stronger fleet of 40 to 50 ships serving the Atlantic, North and South America, Africa and the Mediterranean and Baltic Seas.

The three firms' initials were combined to form the moniker "K Line" in 1921.

K Line founder, Kojiro Matsukata, was also known as an art collector. The National Museum of Western Art in Tokyo's Ueno Park was established around the core of Matsukata's private collection. In addition, the Tokyo National Museum houses his extensive collection of Ukiyo-eprints.

In 1926, according to Lloyds, the newly established "K" Line reached the rank of 13th in the world, behind compatriots NYK (9th) but ahead of O.S.K. (14th).

By the end of World War II, Kawasaki Kisen had lost 56 vessels; 12 survived.

Prior to World War II, the holding company Kawasaki Heavy Industries was part of the Kobe Kawasaki zaibatsu, which included Kawasaki Steel and Kawasaki Kisen. After the war, KHI became part of the DKB Group (keiretsu).

1945-1961
During that vital recovery period, "K" Line steadily returned to the building and operation of ships, reestablished bases of operation around the world, increased earnings and took other steps to restore corporate strength and vibrancy of the company.

1962-1967
After the merger with Iino Kisen, "K" Line was newly capitalized at ¥9 billion and controlled a fleet of 104 ships, 55 of which were also owned by "K" Line. The merger gave "K" Line a solid foundation to advance dynamically into the future both as one of the world's largest shipping lines in terms of fleet size and as a well-balanced, integrated organization.

1971
K Line opens International Transportation Service, a container terminal company in the Port of Long Beach.

The Car Carrier transport division was inaugurated with the launch of the new Roll-on/roll-off vessel Toyota Maru No. 10.
K-Line would thereafter enlarge the fleet up to 70 Car carriers vessels. All owned RORO vessels started to include in the first part of their names the word “Highway” (opposite to its container fleet's vessels that include the word “Bridge” into their names), to symbolize a link in between Japan and the rest of the world served by sea.

2003
KESS - K Line Europe Short Sea is inaugurated in July 2003 in Germany, as a dedicated feeder operator in Europe specialized in brand new cars shipping in between 
European, Scandinavian, Baltic and Mediterranean ports.
The company tonnage is composed of 11 Roll-on/roll-off ships.

2007

K Line Offshore AS was founded in Arendal, Norway in October 2007 as a subsidiary of K Line to provide offshore support services to oil and gas fields. They have commissioned new ships suitable for oil and gas fields in ultra-deep water, harsh environments and/or remote areas. They operate the following ships:
KL Arendalfjord - Delivered 24 October 2008
KL Brevikfjord - Delivered 24 September 2010
KL Sandefjord - Delivered 7 January 2011
KL Brisfjord - Delivered 13 January 2011
KL Brofjord - Delivered 5 April 2011
KL Saltfjord - Delivered 14 April 2011
KL Barentsfjord - Delivered 28 June 2011

On September 30, 2007, Shuichiro Maeda, K-Line president, said the company will build 10 cargo ships to be manned by an all-Filipino officers and crew. The vessels are expected to be finished by 2010. It will employ 7,000 Filipinos in the next 4 years (3,330 officers and 3,600 ratings or crew). K-Line will build the K-Line Maritime Academy-Philippines operational in February 2008 and is intended to train at least 10,000 seafarers a year.

2017

In 2017, K Line, Nippon Yusen (NYK) and Mitsui O.S.K. Lines (MOL) announced that they would merge and jointly operate their global container shipping services as Ocean Network Express (ONE), in order to better compete against other global container shipping groups. ONE would merge all container shipping services of the three companies, as well as their port terminal operating subsidiaries in various countries, except in Japan, while keeping their other shipping services separate. ONE began operations on April 1, 2018. with the company headquarters in Tokyo, Japan, an business operation headquarters in Singapore and regional headquarters in: London, United Kingdom; Richmond, Virginia; and São Paulo, Brazil.

2018
On 23 July, KESS car carrier Makassar Highway ran hard aground at full speed in the Tjust archipelago near Loftahammar, Sweden, causing an oil spill. By his own account, the captain had ordered a course close to land, far from established shipping lanes, in order to gain mobile phone reception. The ship's satellite communication system and black box were inoperable when departing Cuxhaven for Södertälje, and alarm systems had been disabled. An estimated  of oil were spilled. The ship was towed to Oskarshamn, where its cargo of 1,325 vehicles were offloaded. The chief mate was taken into custody and accepted a fine for intoxication and recklessness in maritime traffic. His blood alcohol content by mass at the time of the accident was estimated at 1.15 permille, based on samples taken after the accident. The oil spill is also being investigated as an  environmental crime.

2019
On 15 June 2019, car carrier Diamond Highway caught fire while sailing in between the ports of Singapore and Batangas.
Philippines Coast guard was alerted, and a mission to rescue the 25 members of the Crew was undertaken by another car carrier sailing in proximity.
The ship had to be abandoned, and later towed to dry dock.
The reason why the fire broke out is unknown, but possibly related to the cargo on board.

Fleet

References

External links

Official website
Kline Global Roro Site 

Shipping companies of Japan
Transport companies based in Tokyo
Container shipping companies
Transport companies established in 1919
Japanese brands
Companies listed on the Tokyo Stock Exchange
Ro-ro shipping companies
Car carrier shipping companies
Japanese companies established in 1919